Calophasia angularis is a moth of the family Noctuidae. The species was first described by Pierre Chrétien in 1911. It is found from the western parts of the Sahara and Morocco throughout all North Africa, Riyadh, Israel, Jordan and Turkmenistan.

Adults are on wing from February to March. There is one generation per year.

External links

Cuculliinae
Moths of the Middle East
Moths described in 1911